The Mother Bethel African Methodist Episcopal Church is an historic church and congregation which is located at 419 South 6th Street in Center City Philadelphia, Pennsylvania, USA. The congregation, founded in 1794, is the oldest African Methodist Episcopal congregation in the nation.  

Its present church, completed in 1890, is the oldest church property in the United States to be continuously owned by African Americans.  It was designated a National Historic Landmark in 1972.

History of the congregation

The church was proposed in 1791 by members of the Free African Society of Philadelphia, including Absalom Jones, out of a desire to create a space for autonomous African-American worship and community in the city. The desire to create the church was strengthened in 1792, after African-American members of St. George's Methodist Church walked out due to racial segregation in the worship services. Mother Bethel was one of the first African-American churches in the United States, dedicated July 29, 1794, by Bishop Francis Asbury.  

On October 12, 1794, Reverend Robert Blackwell announced that the congregation was received in full fellowship in the Methodist Episcopal Church. 

In 1816, Rev. Richard Allen brought together other black Methodist congregations from the region to organize the new African Methodist Episcopal Church denomination. He was elected bishop of this denomination. After the American Civil War, its missionaries went to the South to help freedmen and planted many new churches in the region.

In 1838, the building was damaged during the riots that followed the destruction of Pennsylvania Hall.

Allen and his wife, Sarah Allen are both buried in the present church's crypt. The current church building was constructed in 1888–1890, and it has been designated a National Historic Landmark.

On October 25, 2009, "The Great Gathering" took place at St. George's Church in which the community of Mother Bethel AME and St. George's congregations gathered for Sunday worship at St. George's for the first time since the historic walkout. The Rev. Dr. Mark Kelly Tyler preached for this service.

Building history
The property was acquired for the new congregation in 1794. Its first building was a frame structure originally used as a blacksmith's shop, which was hauled to the site. 

This building was later replaced by frame structures in 1805 and 1841. The 1841 church was reported to have a tunnel connecting it with a nearby Quaker meetinghouse to facilitate the movements of fugitive slaves. 

The present building, which was completed in 1890, is a three-story masonry structure with Romanesque styling. Its large round-arch windows are adorned with stained glass from Germany.

Gallery

See also

List of African-American firsts
List of Pennsylvania firsts
Daniel Coker
List of National Historic Landmarks in Philadelphia
National Register of Historic Places listings in Center City, Philadelphia
History of African Americans in Philadelphia

References

External links
 
 Mother Bethel African Methodist Episcopal Church records finding aid at the Richard Allen Museum Archives

African Methodist Episcopal churches in Pennsylvania
Churches completed in 1890
19th-century Methodist church buildings in the United States
Churches in Philadelphia
Religious organizations established in 1794
National Historic Landmarks in Pennsylvania
Properties of religious function on the National Register of Historic Places in Philadelphia
Churches on the Underground Railroad
18th-century Methodist church buildings in the United States
African-American history in Philadelphia
Society Hill, Philadelphia
1794 establishments in Pennsylvania
Churches on the National Register of Historic Places in Pennsylvania
Underground Railroad in Pennsylvania